Bálint Szabó (born 18 January 2001) is a Hungarian football midfielder who plays for Turkish club Antalyaspor on loan from the OTP Bank Liga club Paks.

Club career
On 16 February 2023, Szabó joined Antalyaspor in Turkey on loan until the end of the season, with an option to buy.

Career statistics
.

References

External links
 
 

2001 births
Sportspeople from Székesfehérvár
Living people
Hungarian footballers
Hungary youth international footballers
Hungary under-21 international footballers
Association football midfielders
Fehérvár FC players
Budaörsi SC footballers
Kaposvári Rákóczi FC players
Paksi FC players
Antalyaspor footballers
Nemzeti Bajnokság I players
Nemzeti Bajnokság II players
Nemzeti Bajnokság III players
Süper Lig players
Hungarian expatriate footballers
Expatriate footballers in Turkey
Hungarian expatriate sportspeople in Turkey